Aphonopelma chamberlini, also known as the Paso Robles rusty red tarantula, is regarded by some sources as a tarantula species endemic to California, and by others as synonymous with Aphonopelma iodius.

Described in 1995, it is known from the vicinity of Paso Robles, California. The species name honors arachnologist Ralph Vary Chamberlin, who was responsible for naming a large number of Aphonopelma species.

A 2013 study suggested A. chamberlini was synonymous with Aphonopelma brunnius, which has since been included in Aphonopelma iodius.

References

chamberlini
Endemic fauna of California
Spiders of the United States
Spiders described in 1995
Fauna without expected TNC conservation status